Graphium latreillianus, the coppery swordtail, is a butterfly in the family Papilionidae. It is found in Guinea, Sierra Leone, Liberia, Ivory Coast, Ghana, Nigeria, Cameroon, Sao Tome and Principe, Equatorial Guinea, Gabon, the Republic of the Congo, Angola, the Central African Republic, the Democratic Republic of the Congo, Chad, Uganda and Tanzania. Its habitat consists of primary forests.

Males mud-puddle and are also attracted to urine-soaked sand, human perspiration and camp rubbish tips.

Subspecies
Graphium latreillianus latreillianus (Guinea, Sierra Leone, Liberia, Ivory Coast, Ghana)
Graphium latreillianus theorini (Aurivillius, 1881)  (Nigeria, Cameroon, Sao Tome and Principe, Equatorial Guinea, Gabon, Congo, Democratic Republic of the Congo, Angola, Central African Republic, Chad, western Uganda, Tanzania)

Taxonomy
It is a member of the  tynderaeus -clade (Graphium  tynderaeus, Graphium philonoe, Graphium  latreillianus).

References

Carcasson, R.H. 1960 "The Swallowtail Butterflies of East Africa (Lepidoptera, Papilionidae)". Journal of the East Africa Natural History Society pdf Key to East Africa members of the species group, diagnostic and other notes and figures. (Permission to host granted by The East Africa Natural History Society

Latre
Butterflies of Africa
Butterflies described in 1819
Taxa named by Jean-Baptiste Godart